Ampittia dalailama is a species of butterfly in the family Hesperiidae. It was described by Paul Mabille in 1876. It is found in Tibet and western China. Hindwing beneath brown, densely dusted with yellow scales, with three yellow spots near the base and a postmedian as well as a subterminal row of yellow dots; the postmedian spots of cellules 3 and 4 are placed near the centre of these cellules and cover their whole breadth.

Subspecies
Ampittia dalailama dalailama
Ampittia dalailama jesta Evans, 1939 (China)

References

Butterflies described in 1876
Ampittia
Butterflies of Asia
Taxa named by Paul Mabille